Zlaudus (Zelandus, Zeland or Zaland; died c. 1262) was bishop of Veszprém in the Kingdom of Hungary from 1245 to his death. He functioned as Chancellor of Hungary in 1226.

Life
He originated from the Transdanubian branch of the gens Kaplon (or Kaplony) as the son of Martin (Márton), ispán of Vas County. He served as canon of Székesfehérvár from 1226 to 1236. After the death of bishop Bartholomew he was the chapter then provost of Veszprém. He was elected bishop of Veszprém in 1245, however King Béla IV refused to recognize the appointment, because Zlaudus did not ask for his endorsement.

Zlaudus built the Tátika Castle in the Keszthely Mountain, near Zalaszántó. That was one of the first private castles in the Kingdom of Hungary. He left his fortune to the Roman Catholic Church, however his genus acquired the castle.

References

Sources

  Markó, László: A magyar állam főméltóságai Szent Istvántól napjainkig – Életrajzi Lexikon p. 314. (The High Officers of the Hungarian State from Saint Stephen to the Present Days – A Biographical Encyclopedia) (2nd edition); Helikon Kiadó Kft., 2006, Budapest; .
  Hungarian Catholic Lexicon
  Bishops of Veszprém

1262 deaths
13th-century Hungarian people
13th-century Roman Catholic bishops in Hungary
Bishops of Veszprém
Zlaudus
Year of birth unknown